The Tenth Case is a 1917 American silent drama film directed by George Kelson and starring June Elvidge, John Bowers and George MacQuarrie.

Cast
 June Elvidge as Claudia Payton 
 John Bowers as Sanford King 
 George MacQuarrie as Jerome Landis 
 Gladden James as Harry Landis 
 Eric Mayne as Schuyler Payton 
 Eloise Clement as Laura Brandon 
 Charles Dungan as Judge Wallace

References

Bibliography
 Langman, Larry. American Film Cycles: The Silent Era. Greenwood Publishing, 1998.

External links
 

1917 films
1917 drama films
1910s English-language films
American silent feature films
Silent American drama films
American black-and-white films
World Film Company films
1910s American films